Medvenka is the name of several inhabited localities in Russia.

Urban localities
Medvenka, Kursk Oblast, a work settlement in Medvensky District of Kursk Oblast

Rural localities
Medvenka, Kireyevsky District, Tula Oblast, a village in Dedilovsky Rural Okrug of Kireyevsky District of Tula Oblast
Medvenka, Leninsky District, Tula Oblast, a village in Medvensky Rural Okrug of Leninsky District of Tula Oblast